Audley Alexander (born 10 October 1991) is a Saint Lucian cricketer. He made his first-class debut for the Windward Islands in the 2016–17 Regional Four Day Competition on 16 December 2016. He made his List A debut for the Windward Islands in the 2016–17 Regional Super50 on 8 February 2017.

References

External links
 

1991 births
Living people
Saint Lucian cricketers
Windward Islands cricketers